A county corporate or corporate county was a type of subnational division used for local government in England, Wales, and Ireland.

Counties corporate were created during the Middle Ages, and were effectively small self-governing county-empowered entities such as towns or cities which were deemed to be important enough to be independent from their counties. A county corporate could also be known as a county of itself, similar to an independent city or consolidated city-county in other countries.

While they were administratively distinct counties, with their own sheriffs and lord lieutenancies, most of the counties corporate remained part of the "county at large" for purposes such as the county assize courts. From the 17th century, the separate jurisdictions of the counties corporate were increasingly merged with that of the surrounding county, so that by the late 19th century the title was mostly a ceremonial one.

History
By the 14th century, the growth of some towns had led to strong opposition to their government by local counties.  While charters giving various rights were awarded to each borough, some were awarded complete effective independence including their own sheriffs, quarter sessions and other officials, and were sometimes given governing rights over a swathe of surrounding countryside.  They were referred to in the form "Town and County of ..." or "City and County of ...", and so became known as the counties corporate. Other counties corporate were created to deal with specific local problems, such as border conflict (in the case of Berwick-upon-Tweed) and piracy (in the cases of Poole and Haverfordwest).

In the late 19th century the status of counties corporate changed. By the Militia Act 1882 the lieutenancies of the cities and towns were combined with those of adjacent counties, with two exceptions: the City of London, which retained its separate status, and Haverfordwest, which had a separate lieutenancy until 1974.  Then the Local Government Act 1888 created the new status of county borough in England and Wales, with administrative functions similar to counties corporate.  Some smaller counties corporate (Berwick upon Tweed, Lichfield, Poole, Carmarthen and Haverfordwest) became part of the administrative county in which they were situated. The City of London retained its previous status.  Other counties corporate became county boroughs.

In England and Wales counties corporate were not formally abolished until 1974, although the only vestiges of their existence were the right of the city or borough corporation to appoint a ceremonial sheriff; and the fact that the letters patent appointing lord lieutenants still included the names of the town or city. For example, the Lord Lieutenant of Gloucestershire's full title was "Lieutenant of and in the County of Gloucester, and the City and County of Gloucester, and the City and County of Bristol".

Ireland
In Ireland, eight counties corporate were extant by 1610. Each had its own grand jury, assizes and county gaol, separate from those of the adjoining "county-at-large", even though the relevant city or town might be the county town of the county-at-large, in which case the latter's courthouse and gaol would be considered exclaves of the county-at-large. An act of 1788 allowed the same courthouse or gaol to be shared by county corporate and county-at-large. (Dublin city and County Dublin, like the City of London and Middlesex, were outside the assize system but similarly separate jurisdictions.) Where an act of Parliament referred to "any county" it was doubtful that this included counties corporate, the latter intent being expressed as "any county, county of a city, or county of a town". Acts of 1542 and 1765 were extended to counties corporate in 1807.  Each county corporate contained rural "liberties" outside the city or town's municipal boundary; in six cases these were transferred to the adjacent county-at-large in 1840–2; the exceptions were Galway and Carrickfergus, where the municipal corporation was abolished instead.  The extant baronies of Cork and Dublin are coterminous with the territories transferred from the respective cities in 1840, while the North Liberties barony is part of the former county of the city of Limerick, whose south liberties were absorbed by pre-existing baronies. The 1842 report of the Select Committee on Grand Jury Presentments of Ireland found none of the counties corporate except Drogheda derived any advantage from their status, and recommended they be absorbed as baronies of the adjoining county-at-large. The counties corporate were explicitly abolished in 1899 under the terms of the Local Government (Ireland) Act 1898. Cork, Dublin, Limerick and Waterford became county boroughs.  Carrickfergus, Drogheda, Galway and Kilkenny became parts of administrative counties. The baronies of Carrickfergus and Galway are coterminous with the former corporate counties.

List of counties corporate
The counties corporate (listed with date of creation where known) were:

England
County of the Borough and Town of Berwick upon Tweed (s.6 of the Berwick-on-Tweed Act 1836, except that the Parliamentary constituency was not made a county borough constituency)
County of the Town of Bristol (1373, city since 1542)
County of the City of Canterbury (1471)
County of the Town of Chester (1238/1239, city since 1541)
County of the City of Coventry (1451, abolished 1842)
County of the City of Exeter (1537)
County of the Town of Gloucester (1483, city since 1541)
Kingston upon Hull, County of Hullshire (1440, restricted to County of the Town of Kingston upon Hull 1835, city since 1897)
County of the City of Lichfield (1556)
County of the City of Lincoln (1409)
City of London (1132)
County of the Town of Newcastle upon Tyne (1400, city since 1882)
County of the City of Norwich (1404)
County of the Town of Nottingham (1448, city since 1897)
County of the Town of Poole (1568)
County of the Town of Southampton (1447, city since 1964)
County of the City of Worcester (1622)
County of the City of York (1396)

Wales
County of the Town of Carmarthen (1604)
County of the Town of Haverfordwest (1479)

Ireland
 County of the Town of Carrickfergus (1569) Carrickfergus gave its name to a "bailiwick" (by 1216) or "county" (by 1276) within the Norman Earldom of Ulster; after the 14th-century Gaelic Resurgence, Norman control was confined to the environs of the town. The town's 1569 charter formally linked its corporation to the eponymous county.
 County of the City of Cork (1608)
 County of the Town of Drogheda (1412)
 County of the City of Dublin (1548)
 County of the Town of Galway (1610)
 County of the City of Kilkenny (1610)
 County of the City of Limerick (1609)
 County of the City of Waterford (1574)
 City and county of Derry (1604–13). The 1604 charter incorporated the city and liberties as the "city and county of Derry". The 1836 report of the commissioners on municipal corporations in Ireland said "the charter does not appear ... to have been further acted upon"; however, in 1609, the commissioners who planned for the Plantation of Ulster held assizes in the "ruined city of Derry", separate from those of County Donegal to the west and County Coleraine to the east, and John Davies called it "this little county". The 1613 charter renamed the city Londonderry and merged it and County Coleraine into the new "County Londonderry", sometimes called "the City and County of Londonderry".

See also
Free imperial city

References

External links
Vision of Britain on counties corporate

Counties of Ireland
Former subdivisions of Wales
Defunct types of subdivision in the United Kingdom
Counties of the United Kingdom